Robert Buigues (born 9 May 1950) is a French former professional football player and manager.

Whilst playing for Olympique de Marseille, Buigues started in the 1976 French Cup final and collected a winner's medal when Marseille defeated Olympique Lyonnais 2–0.

Buigues' long career both as a player and a manager was mostly spent in France, although he did have a short spell as manager of Tunisian Ligue Professionnelle 3 side Medenine in 1998. He retired from management in 2006 after leaving FC Sète.

External links
Robert Buigues profile at chamoisfc79.fr 

1950 births
Living people
French footballers
Association football midfielders
French football managers
SC Bastia players
AC Ajaccio players
Olympique de Marseille players
FC Girondins de Bordeaux players
US Orléans players
Stade Lavallois players
Grenoble Foot 38 players
Grenoble Foot 38 managers
FC Saint Dizier CO managers
Chamois Niortais F.C. managers
US Créteil-Lusitanos managers
Paris FC managers
AS Cannes managers
Racing Club de France Football managers
FC Sète 34 managers
Expatriate football managers in Algeria
USM Annaba managers
CO Médenine managers
Pieds-Noirs
Footballers from Essonne